The Sandown class is a class of fifteen minehunters built primarily for the Royal Navy by Vosper Thornycroft. The Sandown class also serve with the Royal Saudi Navy and the Estonian Navy. The first vessel was commissioned into Royal Navy service on 9 June 1989 and all the British ships are named after coastal towns and cities. They have a secondary role as offshore patrol vessels.

Development
These small fibreglass vessels are single role mine hunters (SRMH) rather than minesweepers. Twelve ships were built for the Royal Navy and three ships were exported to Saudi Arabia. Three Royal Navy vessels were decommissioned following the Strategic Defence Review in 2003; Sandown (January 2005), Inverness (April 2005) and Bridport (July 2004). A further ship, Cromer, was decommissioned and transferred to a training role at the Britannia Royal Naval College in Dartmouth in 2001 as Hindostan.

The three decommissioned vessels were sold to Estonia in September 2006. They were re-equipped with TCS (Tactical Control System) and the Atlas Elektronik Seafox ROV for mine disposal. The sonar system was also updated. The first ship (ex-Sandown), delivered in 2007, has been named , the second (ex-Inverness), was delivered in 2008 and named  and the last (ex-Bridport) named  in 2009.

Future
The 2021 defence white paper announced that all mine countermeasures vessels in the Royal Navy would be retired during the 2020s and replaced by automated systems. It was indicated that the remaining Sandown-class ships would be retired first with the entire class to be withdrawn  from service by 2025. They will be replaced with autonomous minehunting systems and specialized "motherships" deployed by the Royal Fleet Auxiliary (RFA). The first of three command and support vessels for autonomous systems were planned for service entry with the RFA in Spring 2023.

Ramsey and Blyth were decommissioned on 4 August 2021 and following a refit by Babcock, will be transferred to the Romanian Navy instead. In September 2022,   was spotted operating around Firth of Forth carrying the name Cherkasy (Ukrainian: Черкаси) and the pennant number M311. Though still reportedly in commission with the Royal Navy, she was now training sailors of the Ukrainian Navy prior to also being handed over to that Navy. In October 2022 it was reported that Shoreham had been decommissioned from Royal Navy service.

Ships in the class

See also
Hunt-class mine countermeasures vessel

References

External links

 
 
 
Ships of the Royal Saudi Navy